This was a new event in 2012. Melanie Oudin won the title, defeating Mariana Duque in the final, 6–1, 6–1.

Seeds

Main draw

Finals

Top half

Bottom half

References 
 Main draw
 Qualifying draw

John Newcombe Women's Pro Challenge - Singles